Mingjiao Temple, may refer to:

 Mingjiao Temple (Anhui), in Hefei, Anhui, China
 Mingjiao Temple (Zhejiang), in Zhuji, Zhejiang, China